Ngwo is a town located in the south-eastern state of Enugu, Nigeria, with a population of about 100,000 people. The towns native population are of Igbo ethnicity.

History

Ngwo people descended from the man called Ngwu-Ako who lived at a place now called "Isi Okpoto" the present day St. Mary Catholic Church and its environs with his wife. Ngwu-Ako gave it the name "Okpotokpo" literally in English (large) because the fruits and trees that grew there were of very large sizes and shapes. That is, for him, they were "okpotokpo" (very large/huge). Living there with his wife, they begot their ten (10) male children who eventually metamorphosed into the ten villages of Ngwo, namely: Uboji, Amankwo, Ameke, Ukaka, Enugu, Etiti, Amachala, Amaebo, Okwojo, and Umuase. While the first three (3) got settled at a place now called Ngwo-uno, the last seven (7) settled at a place also now called Ngwo-asaa. That accounts for the two (2) big shades/components of Ngwo, namely: (Ngwo-uno) and Ngwo-asaa (Ngwo-egu). While Ngwo-uno is made up of three main villages, namely: Amankwo, Ameke, and Uboji, Ngwo-asaa is composed of seven villages, viz: Enugu, Etiti, Amachala, Ukaka, Amaebo, Okwojo, and Umuase.

Geography
Ngwo is the only town in Nigeria that is in three Local Government Areas. Those Local Government Areas include: Udi, Enugu North and Enugu South Local Government Areas. This has been so, either for political reasons or for Ngwo being critical, as a major landlord, to the commercial nerve centres of those Local Government Areas, namely: Ninth Mile Corner and Enugu township. Geographically, Ngwo is bounded to the north by Abor, to the south by Nsude, to the west by Eké, and to the east by Niké. Ngwo remains a historically important place in Enugu state.
Ngwo is a hilly area, with much of the land area being up to 600 meters above sea level. The hills are moderately sloping and undulating.

Development is fast enveloping Ngwo town considering the high spate of commercial activities both at Enugu township and Ninth mile Corner, Ngwo.

Governance
The first "Okpoto" (High chief) of Ngwo was Chief Donald Nnadi Oji, brought in by British colonialism. The second "Okpoto" of Ngwo was Chief Josiah O. Agu. Ameke Ngwo is one of the ten formative villages of Ngwo, which, in 2001, was upgraded to the status of an Autonomous Community by the Enugu State Government which gave rise to the establishment of the position of the traditional ruler, called the Igwe.

Igwe Jerome Charles Okolo, ‘Ogwugwuebenebe XXI’, of Ameke Ngwo, became the first holder of this position having been unanimously elected by the entire community in October 2003. His coronation was one of those huge community-wide festivals, for which the Igbo people of Eastern Nigeria are renowned. The ever impressive Ijele Masquerade – the king of Igbo masquerades, a multi-storey towering ensemble of carvings, masks and fabrics - made one of its very rare outings to grace the occasion, which was held on the football grounds of the local community primary school. (The creation of the so-called autonomous communities is sowing the seeds of disunity within the greater Ngwo community; instead of just one 'Okpoto of Ngwo', we now have Igwe of Ameke, Igwe of Uboji, Igwe of Amankwo, Ama of Ime-Ama (Okwojo), and the Esa of Ngwo Asa, making a total number of 5 Igwes in Ngwo Clan. At this rate, we may end up with over ten (10) mushroom 'igwe's or petit chiefs - the end result will be the loss of the real meaning of any of these titles.

Uboji is the first son of Ngwo, and Amokwe is the first son of Uboji, Amokwe-uwani; the ehums; aborigines hold the owhor, the staff; whose inheritance is by succession and give interpretation to tradition and traditional practices, the first traditional ruler of Uboji, Igwe Engr Basil Chibunine Ugwuozor was chosen based on this progenital fact. On issues of controversies in Ngwo, such issues are resolved by reaching the Ndinka (council of elders) Amokwe-uwani. In modern history, Onyeihu Isaac Ekete Eze (aged more than 122 years) held the owhor and on his transition, Elder Thompson Mba (aged more than 120 years) inherited it, and later Pa Jacob Ani Mba, he died at the age of 106 years Next to Pa Jacob Mba is Pa Michael Onyia (aged more than 110 years) followed by Elder Elias O Ugwuozor; who also is the first surviving son of late pa Mark Ugwuozor; one of the first people to embrace Christianity in Ngwo. Elder Elias Ugwuozor did not hold the owhor owing to his transition before Elder Michael Ngwu Onyia. Ngwo is a town and a clan that extended into three local governments; Udi, Enugu North and Enugu South.
H.E Chief C C Onoh, former Governor of old Anambra State was one of notable sons of Ngwo.

References 

Towns in Enugu State

Traditional wears 
1. Ozo

The ozo is a traditional Igbo dress usually worn by men. It is made of a variety of materials, but usually cotton or silk.

The ozo is wrapped around the body with the waistband positioned in front and the wide part at the back.

2. Ugba

The ugba is an Igbo traditional dress that was traditionally worn by women, but it can be worn by either sex today.

It has a loose top and a close-fitting skirt gathered under the breasts with fabric pleats to create fullness in the skirt.

The ugba’s fabric shapes itself to fit any size person due to its use of an elasticized waistband which makes it easy to wear regardless of weight fluctuation (Wikipedia).

3. Anamu

The anamu is an Igbo traditional dress that can be worn by both men and women in Nigeria today, in addition to being historically worn only by royalty.

It has elaborate embroidery which often includes beads, sequins, and ribbons (Wikipedia).

4. Iga Adi Kpekpe

The igba adi kpekpe is an Igbo traditional dress for women that can still be seen today.
etc